Bursatella hirsuta is a species of large sea slug or sea hare, a marine gastropod mollusk in the family Aplysiidae, the sea hares.

Distribution
This species occurs on the south coast of Australia and in Western Australia, where it was previously mistaken for Bursatella leachii. The adult has a distinctive humped back and all-over brown hairy projections, finer than those in B. leachii, but juveniles of the two species are easily confused. Its range apparently overlaps with B. leachii in central Victoria.

References 

Aplysiidae
Gastropods described in 2020
Gastropods of Australia